This is a list of Dartmoor tors and hills. Dartmoor is a National Park in South West England that contains many granite outcrops of many different sizes. The main authority (other than the OS map) is "Dartmoor Tors and Rocks" by Ken Ringwood.

A–B

C–E

F–G

H–K

L–M

N–R

S

T–Z

See also

Notes
The total number of named tors and hills on the moor varies considerably depending on the source.  Crossing refers to tors as "These granite masses, of which there are about 170 on Dartmoor".  There are at least as many named Hills, Downs, Beacons etc. as well as Rocks used to refer to tors.  It is not uncommon for a tor and a hill to share a name, as Tor refers to the granite outcrop (for example Nattor Down), equally, as can be seen in the list above, many names recur.  Even the definition of Dartmoor varies between sources, particularly between modern sources and those that predate the national park.

References and further reading

 Tim Jenkinson, Max Piper & Paul Buck: Tors of Dartmoor Website (www.torsofdartmoor.co.uk) This searchable database of the tors of Dartmoor National Park is the most definitive list available of both lesser and well known tors and rocks. 
Terry Bound: The A to Z of Dartmoor Tors (Obelisk Publications)

 
Hills of Devon
Dartmoor
Dartmoor
Dartmoor